Sunbury is a city in Delaware County, Ohio, United States.  The population was 4,389 during the 2010 census. The city is centered on a New England-styled traditional town square with a historic village hall located in the center of a village green. Located here is a major Showa Corporation factory, which produces automotive parts for Honda of America. The city is home to a K-12 public school district, the Big Walnut Local School District and their sports team, the 'Golden Eagles'. The district also serves students in the neighboring town of Galena, Ohio. Sunbury went from being a village to a city on October 22, 2021.

Geography
Sunbury is located at  (40.242838, -82.860439).

Sunbury neighbors Galena, Ohio to the south, with which it shares a school district and has provided services such as police. Sunbury is east of Delaware, Ohio (not to be confused with Delaware County, where they are both located).

Demographics

2010 census
As of the census of 2010, there were 4,389 people, 1,671 households, and 1,211 families living in the city. The racial makeup of the city was 95.2% White, 1.1% African American, 0.2% Native American, 1.1% Asian, 0.1% Pacific Islander, 0.8% from other races, and 1.5% from two or more races. Hispanic or Latino of any race were 1.7% of the population.

There were 1,671 households, of which 42.5% had children under the age of 18 living with them, 54.3% were married couples living together, 13.9% had a female householder with no husband present, 4.2% had a male householder with no wife present, and 27.5% were non-families. 23.1% of all households were made up of individuals, and 8.9% had someone living alone who was 65 years of age or older. The average household size was 2.62 and the average family size was 3.11.

The median age in the city was 33.6 years. 29.8% of residents were under the age of 18; 6.9% were between the ages of 18 and 24; 30.3% were from 25 to 44; 21.7% were from 45 to 64; and 11.4% were 65 years of age or older. The gender makeup of the city was 47.4% male and 52.6% female.

2000 census
As of the census of 2000, there were 2,630 people, 1,016 households, and 771 families living in the city. The population density was 1,035.0 people per square mile (399.8/km). There were 1,057 housing units at an average density of 416.0 per square mile (160.7/km). The racial makeup of the city was 97.83% White, 0.38% African American, 0.38% Native American, 0.23% Asian, 0.04% Pacific Islander, 0.23% from other races, and 0.91% from two or more races. Hispanic or Latino of any race were 1.10% of the population. As of the 2010 census, the population had increased to 4,389.

There were 1,016 households, out of which 37.1% had children under the age of 18 living with them, 57.7% were married couples living together, 14.2% had a female householder with no husband present, and 24.1% were non-families. 20.8% of all households were made up of individuals, and 9.9% had someone living alone who was 65 years of age or older. The average household size was 2.56 and the average family size was 2.98.

26.6% of the population was under the age of 18, 7.2% from 18 to 24, 30.8% from 25 to 44, 22.3% from 45 to 64, and 13.1% who were 65 years of age or older. The median age was 36 years. For every 100 females there were 88.3 males. For every 100 females age 18 and over, there were 87.1 males.

The median income for a household in the city was $46,477, and the median income for a family was $50,750. Males had a median income of $38,281 versus $28,210 for females. The per capita income for the city was $18,861. About 4.1% of families and 4.7% of the population were below the poverty line, including 4.9% of those under age 18 and 5.0% of those age 65 or over.

Points of interest

Sunbury is growing by leaps and bounds, having just annexed over 300 acres, and with plans to annex an additional 255 acres which will take the boundary out to Interstate 71. A major manufacturing facility owned and operated by Showa Corporation is located there, producing automobile parts for Honda of America. Sunbury is home to the Ohio Fallen Heroes Memorial, a memorial that commemorates every Ohio soldier who has been reported dead or missing while at war since 9/11. Sunbury was chosen to be the home of the Memorial due to the city's proximity to Centerburg, Ohio (near the geographical center of Ohio, and a prominent midwestern soil type) and the city's proximity to Interstate 71, a major highway connecting Cleveland; Columbus; and Cincinnati, respectively from north to south.

Multiple super markets and fast food restaurants are located in Sunbury, including a McDonald's, Wendy's, Subway, Panera, Taco Bell, and Dairy Queen.

Sunbury is home to the Big Walnut Local School District (BWLS), a K-12 public school district, and their sports team, the 'Big Walnut Golden Eagles', who in 2007 became 'State Champs' in their football division. BWLS also serves students in the neighboring village of Galena, Ohio. The district consist of the following schools: Big Walnut High School, Big Walnut Middle School, Big Walnut 'Intermediate' School (grades 5-6), Hylen Souders Elementary, Harrison Street Elementary, General Rosecrans Elementary, and finally Big Walnut Elementary. The four different elementary schools each serve part of the district. Hylen Souders Elementary located in and serving students of Galena.

Public services

Emergency medical services are provided by the Delaware County EMS and Station 2 is located at 283 W. Granville Street. Fire and Rescue services are provided by the B.S.T.&G. Fire District located at 350 W. Cherry Street.

Police services are provided by the Sunbury Police Department which is located at 9 East Granville Street.  The department is a 24-hour agency and offers a range of services such as vehicle lock-outs and house checks to its visitors and residents.

Notable people

Billy Southworth - American outfielder and manager in Major League Baseball (MLB)

References

External links
 city website
 Community Library

Villages in Delaware County, Ohio
Villages in Ohio